Patrick J. Ballantine (born March 17, 1965) is an American attorney and politician who was a Republican member of the North Carolina General Assembly, rising to become the Senate Minority Leader and the Republican Party's nominee for governor in 2004.

Early life and education 
Ballantine was born in Grand Forks, North Dakota and moved to North Carolina as a child. He graduated from Cape Fear Academy in Wilmington in 1983 and earned a bachelor's degree in political science from the University of North Carolina at Chapel Hill in 1987. Ballantine earned a Juris Doctor  from the University of Dayton in 1990.

Career 
In 1994, Ballantine became a member of the North Carolina Senate; starting in 1999, he served as the Republican minority leader. He originally represented the state's fourth Senate district, focussed on New Hanover county, where he resides in Wilmington. In the redistricting that followed the 2000 census, his district became the ninth.

Patrick Ballantine emerged as one of the leading candidates for the Republican gubernatorial nomination to challenge Governor Mike Easley in the 2004 election, although he faced heated competition for the nomination from former Charlotte mayor Richard Vinroot and former Congressman Bill Cobey. In July, both Ballantine and Vinroot received 30% of the vote in a six-way Republican primary, with Ballantine edging out Vinroot by only 1,500 votes statewide. Under North Carolina law, Vinroot could have chosen to seek a runoff; however, he elected not to exercise that option, leaving Ballantine the Republican nominee.

Ballantine stepped down from his General Assembly seat in April in order to focus on his run for governor. His law partner Woody White was appointed to fill his Senate seat, but was defeated in the general election by Democrat Julia Boseman.

Ballantine's campaign focused on his youth, optimism, and vision, offering what he referred to as "A New Generation of Conservative Leadership" for North Carolina; however, Easley's campaign focused on Ballatine's Senate voting record. Ballantine was bested by Easley, the incumbent, by a thirteen-point margin in the November 2004 general election.

Personal life 
He married Lisa Beard on August 10, 1991. They have two children.

References

External links
 

|-

|-

|-

1965 births
Living people
Republican Party North Carolina state senators
Politicians from Grand Forks, North Dakota
University of Dayton alumni
University of North Carolina at Chapel Hill alumni
21st-century American politicians
Candidates in the 2004 United States elections